Gérard Higny (20 August 1931 – 7 February 1997) was a  Belgian rower. He competed at the 1960 and 1964 Summer Olympics in the double sculls event, with Jean-Marie Lemaire and Michel De Meulemeester, and finished in sixth and ninth place, respectively. Higny won a bronze medal at the 1957 European Championships, together with Henri Steenacker.

References 

1931 births
1997 deaths
Belgian male rowers
Rowers at the 1960 Summer Olympics
Rowers at the 1964 Summer Olympics
Olympic rowers of Belgium
Sportspeople from Liège
European Rowing Championships medalists
20th-century Belgian people